The United States Marine Corps Silent Drill Platoon is a 24-man rifle platoon led by a Captain and Platoon Sergeant of the United States Marine Corps (USMC).

Often referred to as The Marching Twenty-Four, the unit performs a unique silent precision exhibition drill. The purpose of the platoon is to exemplify the discipline and professionalism of the Marine Corps. The Silent Drill Platoon, which first performed in 1948, originally as a one-time show, received such an overwhelming response that it soon became part of the routine parades at Marine Barracks, Washington, D.C.

In 2022 Kelsey M. Hastings became the first woman to command the Silent Drill Platoon.

Drill movements
The Marines execute a series of calculated drill movements and precise handling of their hand-polished  M1 Garand rifles with fixed bayonets. The routine concludes with a unique rifle inspection involving elaborate rifle spins and tosses. All drill movements are done with superfluous spins of the rifle, making the Silent Drill Platoon's drill unique from other Marine units' drill movements.

Selection and training
Marines are selected from students at the two Schools of Infantry, located at Camp Pendleton, California and Camp Lejeune, North Carolina, from interviews conducted by barracks personnel.

Once selected, Marines are assigned to Marine Barracks, Washington, D.C., to serve a two-year ceremonial tour. Beyond their ceremonial duties, the Marines collaterally train in the field as infantrymen. Throughout the year, these Marines hone their infantry skills at the Marine Corps Combat Development Command in Marine Corps Base Quantico, Virginia and other bases. The Marines selected must be male and must be between 5'11" and 6'1" tall and be in the median of their weight requirements for their height. Uniformity is a key asset.

Experienced members of the Silent Drill Platoon, usually non-commissioned officers, have the opportunity to audition to become rifle inspectors. They must go through inspection tryouts graded by rifle inspectors of the previous year. Only two Marines who audition will become rifle inspectors.

Once the year's Silent Drill Platoon members are selected, they begin their training in Washington, and continue to train at Marine Corps Air Station Yuma, Arizona, perfecting their routine year-round. Throughout the year, they perform at Marine Barracks, Washington, D.C., and at numerous events across the United States, and also represent the Marine Corps abroad.

References

External links

 Official website
 
 Photos of the Silent Drill Team at the USMC Sunset Parade at the Iwo Jima Memorial

Military units and formations of the United States Marine Corps
Ceremonial units of the United States military
Military ceremonies